Quintus Tineius Clemens was a Roman senator. He was Consul Ordinarius in AD 195 with Publius Julius Scapula Tertullus Priscus.

He was the son of Quintus Tineius Sacerdos Clemens, consul in 158. His brothers were Quintus Tineius Rufus and Quintus Tineius Sacerdos.

Family tree

References

2nd-century Romans
Year of birth unknown
Year of death unknown
Imperial Roman consuls
Clemens